Alum Rock is an electoral ward of Birmingham City Council in the east of Birmingham, West Midlands, covering an urban area to the east of the city centre.

The ward was created in 2018 as a result of boundary changes that saw the number of wards in Birmingham increase from 40 to 69.

Boundaries 

The ward was largely created from the former Washwood Heath ward and is contained within the Birmingham Hodge Hill constituency. The seat includes the historic area of Saltley.

Profile

The ward is largely composed of late-Victorian and Edwardian terrace housing which runs the length of the Alum Rock Road and the roads off it. The area is notable for a high ethnic minority population many of whom can trace their origins to 20th century migrants from the Indian Sub-continent.

Councillors

Elections since 2018

References 

Wards of Birmingham, West Midlands